Oil Hill, Kansas is a ghost town in Butler County, Kansas, United States.

History
The community was formed during the oil boom in Butler County.  A post office was established in Oil Hill in 1917, and remained in operation until it was discontinued in 1958. The community no longer exists and is considered a ghost town.

Education
The modern day area around Oil Hill is served by the El Dorado USD 490 public school district.  Oil Hill Elementary School is named to commemorate the history of the former community.

Notable people
 Larry Hartshorn (1933–2007), professional football player for the Chicago Cardinals.

References

Further reading

External links
 Historic Images of Oil Hill, Special Photo Collections at Wichita State University Library
 Butler County maps: Current, Historic, KDOT

Unincorporated communities in Kansas
Unincorporated communities in Butler County, Kansas